Der Fuchs is a German television series.

See also
List of German television series

External links
 

1988 German television series debuts
1989 German television series endings
German crime television series
German-language television shows
Das Erste original programming